Sir Charles Wentworth Dilke, 2nd Baronet, PC (4 September 1843 – 26 January 1911) was an English Liberal and Radical politician. A republican in the early 1870s, he later became a leader in the radical challenge to Whig control of the Liberal Party, making a number of important contributions, including in the legislation increasing democracy in 1883–1885, his support of the growing labour and feminist movements, and his prolific writings on international affairs.

Touted as a future prime minister, his aspirations to higher political office were effectively terminated in 1885 after a notorious and well-publicised divorce case.

His disgrace and the alignment of Joseph Chamberlain with the Conservatives both greatly weakened the radical cause.

Background and education
Dilke was the son of Sir Charles Dilke, 1st Baronet. Born in Chelsea in 1843, he was educated at Trinity Hall, Cambridge, where he was President of the Cambridge Union Society. His second wife was the author, art historian, feminist and trade unionist Emily Francis Pattison, née Strong (widow of Rev. Mark Pattison), subsequently known as Lady Dilke.

Despite being a radical, Dilke was also an imperialist; he argued for British imperial domination in his bestselling 1868 book, Greater Britain.

Political career, 1868–1886

Dilke became Liberal Member of Parliament for Chelsea in 1868, which he held until 1886.

In 1871, Dilke caused controversy when he criticised the British monarchy and argued that the United Kingdom should adopt a republican form of government; public criticism made Dilke recant that.

He was Under-Secretary of State for Foreign Affairs from 1880 to 1882, during Gladstone's second government, and was admitted to the Privy Council in 1882. In December of that year, he entered the cabinet as President of the Local Government Board, serving until 1885. A leading and determined radical within the party, he negotiated the passage of the Third Reform Act, which the Conservatives allowed through the House of Lords, in return for a redistribution that they calculated to be marginally favourable to themselves. (The granting of the vote to agricultural labourers threatened Conservative dominance of rural seats, but many double-member seats were abolished, with seats redistributed to suburbia, where Conservative support was growing.) He also supported laws giving the municipal franchise to women, legalising labour unions, improving working conditions and limiting working hours, as well as being one of the earliest campaigners for universal schooling.

Crawford scandal

Dilke's younger brother, Ashton Wentworth Dilke, married Margaret "Maye" Eustace Smith, the eldest daughter of Liberal politician and shipowner Thomas Eustace Smith and his wife, Ellen, in 1876.

Charles Dilke was said to have become the lover of Ellen Smith (his brother's mother-in-law), a relationship which continued after his marriage in 1884.

In July 1885, Charles Dilke was accused of seducing Thomas Eustace Smith's daughter Virginia Crawford ( Smith), who was his brother's sister-in-law (and his actual lover's daughter), in the first year of her marriage to Donald Crawford, another MP. That was supposed to have occurred in 1882, when Virginia was 19, and she claimed that the affair had continued on an irregular basis for the next two and a half years.

Crawford sued for divorce, and the case was heard on 12 February 1886 before The Hon. Mr Justice Butt in the Probate, Divorce and Admiralty Division. Virginia Crawford was not in court, and the sole evidence was her husband's account of Virginia's confession. There were also some accounts by servants, which were both circumstantial and insubstantial. Dilke, aware of his vulnerability over the affair with Virginia's mother, refused to give evidence, largely on the advice of his confidant, Joseph Chamberlain. Butt found paradoxically that Virginia had been guilty of adultery with Dilke but that there was no admissible evidence to show that Dilke had been guilty of adultery with Virginia. He concluded, "I cannot see any case whatsoever against Sir Charles Dilke", dismissed Dilke from the suit with costs and pronounced a decree nisi dissolving the Crawfords' marriage.

The paradoxical finding left doubts hanging over Dilke's respectability, and investigative journalist William Thomas Stead launched a public campaign against him. Two months later, in April, Dilke sought to reopen the case and clear his name by making the Queen's Proctor a party to the case and opposing the decree absolute. Unfortunately, Dilke and his legal team had badly miscalculated (his legal advice has been described as "perhaps the worst professional advice ever given"). Though they had planned to subject Virginia to a searching cross-examination, Dilke, having been dismissed from the case, had no locus standi. As a consequence, it was Dilke who was subjected to severe scrutiny in the witness box by Henry Matthews. Matthews' attack was devastating, and Dilke proved an unconvincing witness. His habit of physically cutting pieces out of his diary with scissors was held up to particular ridicule, as it created the impression that he had cut out evidence of potentially embarrassing appointments. The jury found that Virginia had presented the true version of the facts and that the decree absolute should be granted.

Dilke was ruined. Other women claimed he had approached them for a liaison. Various lurid rumours circulated about his love life, including that he had invited a maidservant to join himself and his lover in bed and that he had introduced one or more of them to "every kind of French vice", and he became a figure of fun in bawdy music-hall songs.

For a time it seemed that he would be tried for perjury. The accusations had a devastating effect on his political career, leading eventually to the loss of his parliamentary seat (Chelsea) in the 1886 UK general election.

Matthews gained public acclaim, winning the seat of Birmingham East as a Conservative at the same election. Queen Victoria, who approved of his performance in the trial, demanded his inclusion in Lord Salisbury's cabinet, and he was made Home Secretary. The Queen had asked in vain for Dilke to be stripped of his membership of the Privy Council.

Dilke spent much of the remainder of his life and much of his fortune trying to exonerate himself, which adds weight to the view that Virginia lied about the identity of her lover. Over the years, it has been suggested that his political colleagues, including Archibald Primrose, 5th Earl of Rosebery, and Chamberlain himself, may have inspired her to accuse him, seeing him as an obstacle to their own ambitions. Dilke was largely exonerated by an inquiry in the early 1890s, which cast doubt on the truthfulness of Virginia's evidence. Her description of their alleged love nest in Warren Street was full of inaccuracies and it has been speculated that she may have been attempting to distract attention from an earlier affair with one Captain Forster.

Political career after 1886 and death

Dilke lost his Chelsea parliamentary seat at the 1886 general election. In 1889, he was approached by the Forest of Dean Liberal Association to stand as its parliamentary candidate since his radical credentials suited the mining constituency seeking employment law reform. Hoping that he could be rehabilitated as a front-line politician, Dilke consulted Liberal leader Gladstone, who discouraged him and so Dilke did not pursue the offer. Three years later, however, Dilke accepted the invitation, against Gladstone's wishes and, at the 1892 general election, was duly elected as the MP for the Forest of Dean, which he held for the remainder of his life.

He hoped to be appointed Secretary of State for War in the Liberal Government formed in 1905, but it was not to be. Dilke attributed his exclusion to the incoming Prime Minister Henry Campbell-Bannerman's lingering resentment towards Dilke for his role in the 1895 "cordite vote", which had brought about the end of Lord Rosebery's administration.

Dilke died in 1911 at 76 Sloane Street, Chelsea; the same house in which he was born. He was cremated at Golders Green Crematorium and his ashes buried at Kensal Green Cemetery.

In popular culture
Following his death in 1911, fundraising commenced to establish a local community hospital in his Forest of Dean constituency. The Dilke Memorial Hospital, Cinderford, was built in 1922 and still exists as a permanent memorial to the popular MP.

Interest in Dilke was revived by Dilke: A Victorian tragedy a 1958 non-fiction work by the Labour Party politician Roy Jenkins. A 1964 West End play The Right Honourable Gentleman by Michael Dyne covers the scandal that brought Dilke down.

Dilke is portrayed by Richard Leech in an episode of the 1975 ATV series Edward the Seventh.

In the 1994 film Sirens, detailing sexual licence in Australia in the 1930s, the local pub is called the "Sir Charles Dilke".

Arms

References

Sources
Chamberlain, M. E. "Sir Charles Dilke and the British Intervention In Egypt, 1882: decision making In a nineteenth-century cabinet." British Journal of International Studies 2#3 (1976): 231–245.
; A denial of the scandal prepared by his niece
; Emphasis on the scandal

—

Primary sources
Dilke, Charles Wentworth. (1868). Greater Britain. Macmillan (reissued by Cambridge University Press, 2009)

External links

 

Blue Plaque at 76 Sloane Street, Brompton, London
The Dilke-Crawford-Roskill Papers held at Churchill Archives Centre

1843 births
1911 deaths
English republicans
Baronets in the Baronetage of the United Kingdom
Liberal Party (UK) MPs for English constituencies
Members of the Privy Council of the United Kingdom
Presidents of the Cambridge Union
Alumni of Trinity Hall, Cambridge
Presidents of the Royal Statistical Society
People educated at Westminster School, London
UK MPs 1868–1874
UK MPs 1874–1880
UK MPs 1880–1885
UK MPs 1895–1900
UK MPs 1900–1906
UK MPs 1906–1910
UK MPs 1910
UK MPs 1910–1918